Ali Asghar Pashapour Alamdari (born 24 October 1951) is an Iranian fencer. He competed at the 1972 and 1976 Summer Olympics.

References

External links
 

1951 births
Living people
Iranian male épée fencers
Olympic fencers of Iran
Fencers at the 1972 Summer Olympics
Fencers at the 1976 Summer Olympics
Asian Games gold medalists for Iran
Asian Games silver medalists for Iran
Asian Games bronze medalists for Iran
Asian Games medalists in fencing
Fencers at the 1974 Asian Games
Medalists at the 1974 Asian Games
Iranian male foil fencers
20th-century Iranian people
21st-century Iranian people